Jesse Bendross (born July 19, 1962) is a former American football wide receiver. He played for the San Diego Chargers from 1984 to 1985 and for the Philadelphia Eagles in 1987.

References

1962 births
Living people
American football wide receivers
Alabama Crimson Tide football players
San Diego Chargers players
Philadelphia Eagles players
National Football League replacement players
Miramar High School alumni